Natalia Voskobovich (born 25 October 1993) is a Belarusian footballer who plays as a goalkeeper in the Top Division for Zenit and has appeared for the Belarus women's national team.

Career
Voskobovich has been capped for the Belarus national team, appearing for the team during the 2019 FIFA Women's World Cup qualifying cycle.

References

External links
 , part 1
 , part 2
 
 

1993 births
Living people
Belarusian women's footballers
Belarus women's international footballers
Women's association football goalkeepers
FC Minsk (women) players